At present there is no official flag of Sikkim, a state in India. The independent Kingdom of Sikkim did have a national flag until it became a state of India in 1975.

Kingdom of Sikkim (1877–1975)

The Kingdom of Sikkim had used several flags during its history. They all contained a Buddhist khorlo prayer wheel with the gankyil as the central element.

Until 1967, the previous flag showed a very complex design with a fanciful border and religious pictograms surrounding the khorlo.

A more simple design was adopted in 1967 because of the difficulty in duplication of the complex flag. The border became solid red, the pictograms were removed and the wheel was redesigned.

With the admission of Sikkim to the Republic of India and with the abolition of the monarchy, the flag lost its official status in 1975.

State of India (1975–present) 
The Government of Sikkim can be represented by a banner that depicts the emblem of the state on a white background.

See also
 Emblem of Sikkim
 National flag of India
 List of Indian state flags

References

External links

Flag and seal of Sikkim at flaggenlexikon.de

 
Flag
Flags of India
Flags introduced in 1967
1967 establishments in Asia
Sikkim